Fennema is a surname. Notable people with this name

 Antony Fennema (1902–84)
 Carl Fennema (born 1926)
 Elizabeth Fennema (1928–2021), American educator
 Joanna Fennema (born 1995)
 Meindert Fennema (born 1946), Dutch political scientist

See also 
 Fenneman

Surnames
Dutch-language surnames